QK may refer to: 

 QK, the IATA designator for Jazz (airline)
 QK, the Library of Congress Classification for botany
 QK-77, a variation of Khorasan wheat or Kamut